This is a list of electoral districts or ridings in Canada for the 1872 Canadian federal election. New seats were added in 1873 when Prince Edward Island became a province.

Electoral Districts are constituencies that elect Members of Parliament in Canada's House of Commons every election.

Nova Scotia – 21 seats
Annapolis
Antigonish
Cape Breton*
Colchester
Cumberland
Digby
Guysborough
Halifax*
Hants
Inverness
Kings
Lunenburg
Pictou*
Queens
Richmond
Shelburne
Victoria
Yarmouth

New Brunswick – 16 seats
Albert
Carleton
Charlotte
City and County of St. John*
City of St. John
Gloucester
Kent
King's
Northumberland
Queen's
Restigouche
Sunbury
Victoria
Westmorland
York

Quebec - 65 seats
Argenteuil
Bagot
Beauce
Beauharnois
Bellechasse
Berthier
Bonaventure
Brome
Chambly
Champlain
Charlevoix
Châteauguay
Chicoutimi—Saguenay
Compton
Dorchester
Drummond—Arthabaska
Gaspé
Hochelaga
Huntingdon
Iverbville
Jacques Cartier
Joliette
Kamouraska
L'Assomption
L'Islet
Laprairie
Laval
Lévis
Lotbinière
Maskinongé
Mégantic
Missisquoi
Montcalm
Montmagny
Montmorency
Montreal Centre
Montreal East
Montreal West
Napierville
Nicolet
Ottawa (County of)
Pontiac
Portneuf
Quebec County
Quebec East
Quebec West
Quebec-Centre
Richelieu
Richmond—Wolfe
Rimouski
Rouville
Saint Maurice
Shefford
Town of Sherbrooke
Soulanges
St. Hyacinthe
St. John's
Stanstead
Témiscouata
Terrebonne
Three Rivers
Two Mountains
Vaudreuil
Verchères
Yamaska

Ontario – 88 seats
Addington
Algoma
Bothwell
Brant North
Brant South
Brockville
Bruce North
Bruce South
Cardwell
Carleton
Cornwall
Dundas
Durham East
Durham West
Elgin East
Elgin West
Essex
Frontenac
Glengarry
Grenville South
Grey East
Grey North
Grey South
Haldimand
Halton
Hamilton*
Hastings East
Hastings North
Hastings West
Huron Centre
Huron North
Huron South
Kent
Kingston
Lambton
Lanark North
Lanark South
Leeds North and Grenville North
Leeds South
Lennox
Lincoln
London
Middlesex East
Middlesex North
Middlesex West
Monck
Muskoka
Niagara
Norfolk North
Norfolk South
Northumberland East
Northumberland West
Ontario North
Ontario South
Ottawa (City of)*
Oxford North
Oxford South
Peel
Perth North
Perth South
Peterborough East
Peterborough West
Prescott
Prince Edward
Renfrew North
Renfrew South
Russell
Simcoe North
Simcoe South
Stormont
Toronto Centre
Toronto East
Victoria North
Victoria South
Waterloo North
Waterloo South
Welland
Wellington Centre
Wellington North
Wellington South
Wentworth North
Wentworth South
West Toronto
York East
York North
York West

Manitoba – 4 seats
Lisgar
Marquette
Provencher
Selkirk

British Columbia – 6 seats
Cariboo
New Westminster
Vancouver
Victoria*
Yale

References
 

* returned two members

1872-1873
1870s in Canada